Sacred tradition is a theological term used in Christian theology. According to the theology of the Catholic, Eastern Orthodox, Oriental Orthodox and Assyrian churches, sacred tradition is the foundation of the doctrinal and spiritual authority of Christianity and of the Bible. Thus, the Bible must be interpreted within the context of sacred tradition and within the community of the denomination.

The Anglican and Methodist churches regard tradition, reason, and experience as sources of authority but as subordinate to scripture – a position known as prima scriptura. That is in contrast to the Lutheran and Reformed traditions, which teach that the Bible alone is a sufficient/infallible basis for all Christian teaching – a position known as sola scriptura. 

For many denominations of Christianity, the writings of the Ante-Nicene Fathers, Nicene Fathers and Post-Nicene Fathers are included in sacred tradition.

Origin of the term
The word tradition is taken from the Latin trado, tradere, meaning "to hand over".

History
Among the earliest examples of the theological appeal to tradition is the response of early orthodox Christianity to Gnosticism, a movement that used some Christian scripture as the basis for its teachings. Irenaeus of Lyons held that 'rule of faith' ('κανών της πίστης') is preserved by a church through its historical continuity (of interpretation and teaching) with the Apostles. Tertullian argued that although interpretations founded on a reading of all Holy Scripture are not prone to error, tradition is the proper guide. Athanasius held that Arianism fell into error primarily by not adhering to tradition.

In the modern era, scholars such as Craig A. Evans, James A. Sanders, and Stanley E. Porter have studied how sacred tradition in the Hebrew Bible was understood and used by New Testament writers to describe Jesus.

Eastern Orthodox Church
For the Eastern Orthodox Christian, there is one tradition, the tradition of the Church, incorporating the scriptures and the teaching of the Church Fathers. As explained by Athanasius of Alexandria (First Letter to Serapion, 28): "Let us look at the very tradition, teaching, and faith of the catholic Church from the very beginning, which the Logos gave (edoken), the Apostles preached (ekeryxan), and the Fathers preserved (ephylaxan). Upon this the Church is founded (tethemeliotai)". 

Sacred tradition for the Eastern Orthodox is the deposit of faith given by Jesus to the Apostles and passed on in the Church from one generation to the next without addition, alteration, or subtraction. Vladimir Lossky described tradition as "the life of the Holy Spirit in the Church".

Georges Florovsky wrote:

Catholic Church
According to Catholic theology, Paul the Apostle exhorted  the faithful to "stand firm and hold fast to the traditions that you were taught by us, either by word of mouth or by our letter" (2 Thessalonians 2:15). The Pauline epistles form part of sacred scripture; what he passed on by "word of mouth" is part of sacred tradition, handed down from the apostles. Both are the inspired word of God; the latter helps to inform understanding of the former. Sacred tradition can never be in conflict with sacred scripture.

Those in the Catholic faith believe that the teachings of Jesus and the Apostles were preserved in the scriptures as well as by word of mouth. This perpetual handing on of the tradition is called the "Living Tradition"; it is believed to be the faithful and constant transmission of the teachings of the Apostles from one generation to the next. That "includes everything which contributes towards the sanctity of life and increase in faith of the People of God; and so the Church, in her teaching, life and worship [the Creeds, the Sacraments, the Magisterium, and the Holy Sacrifice of the Mass], perpetuates and hands on to all generations all that she herself is, all that she believes." The Deposit of Faith refers to the entirety of divine revelation. According to Roman Catholic theology, two sources of revelation constitute a single "Deposit of Faith", meaning that the entirety of divine revelation and the Deposit of Faith is transmitted to successive generations in scripture and sacred tradition (through the teaching authority and interpretation of the Church's Magisterium (which consists of the Church's bishops, in union with the Pope, typically proceeding synods and ecumenical councils).

The Catholic Church views tradition in much the same terms, as a passing down of that same apostolic faith, but, in a critical difference from the Eastern Orthodox position, Catholicism holds that the faith once delivered, the understanding of it continues to deepen and mature over time through the action of the Holy Spirit in the history of the Church and in the understanding of that faith by Christians, all the while staying identical in essence and substance.

In the area of moral theology, Mark D. Jordan said that medieval texts appeared to be inconsistent. According to Giovanni Cappelli, prior to the sixth century, the Church's teachings on morality were incoherent. According to John T. Noonan, "history cannot leave a principle or a teaching untouched; every application to a situation affects our understanding of the principle itself".

Dei Verbum
The Second Vatican Council taught on tradition, scripture, and magisterium in Dei verbum, n. 10:

Thus, all of the teachings of the Catholic Church come from either tradition or scripture, or from the magisterium interpreting tradition and scripture. These two sources, tradition and scripture, are viewed and treated as one source of Divine Revelation, which includes both the deeds of God and the words of God:

The magisterium has a role in deciding authoritatively which truths are a part of sacred tradition.

Lutheranism and Reformed Christianity 
The Lutheran and Reformed traditions of Christianity claim that the Bible alone is the source for Christian doctrine. This position does not deny that Jesus or the apostles preached in person, that their stories and teachings were transmitted orally during the early Christian era, or that truth exists outside of the Bible. For sola scriptura Christians today, however, these teachings are preserved in the Bible as the only inspired medium. Since in the opinion of sola scriptura Christians, other forms of tradition do not exist in a fixed form that remains constant in its transmission from one generation to the next and cannot be referenced or cited in its pure form, there is no way to verify which parts of the "tradition" are authentic and which are not.

Anglicanism and Methodism 
Prima scriptura is upheld by the Anglican and Methodist traditions of Christianity, which suggest that scripture is the primary source for Christian doctrine, but that "tradition, experience, and reason" can nurture the Christian religion as long as they are in harmony with the Bible.

The Anglican Church does accept apostolic tradition, which can be found in the writings of the early Church Fathers, the decrees of the seven Ecumenical Councils, the Creeds, and the liturgical worship of the Church.

See also
 Apostolic Tradition
 Christian tradition
 Oral Torah

References

Further reading
 

 Petley, D.A., ed. (1993). Tradition: Received and Handed on: [papers presented at] a Theological Conference held at the [Anglican] Cathedral Church of St. Peter, Charlottetown, P.E.I., 27 June-1st July 1993. Charlottetown, P.E.I.: St. Peter Publications.

External links
 WELS Topical Q&A: Tradition Apostolic (a Confessional Lutheran perspective)

Christian tradition
Catholic theology and doctrine
Christian terminology
Eastern Orthodox theology